Soyuz 21 (Union 21) was a 1976 Soviet crewed mission to the Salyut 5 space station, the first of three flights to the station. The mission's objectives were mainly military in scope, but included other scientific work. The mission ended abruptly with cosmonauts Boris Volynov and Vitaly Zholobov returning to Earth after 49 days in orbit. The precise reason for the early end of the mission was the subject of much speculation, but was reported to be an emergency evacuation after the Salyut atmosphere developed an acrid odor.

Crew

Backup crew

Reserve crew

Mission parameters 
Mass:  
Perigee:  
Apogee: 
Inclination: 51.6°
Period: 88.7 minutes

Mission highlights 
Salyut 5, the last dedicated military space station in the Soviet space program, was launched 22 June 1976. Its first crew was launched 14 days later on 6 July 1976, with Commander Volynov and Flight Engineer Zholobov aboard Soyuz 21. Based on landing opportunities, observers estimated the mission was intended to last 54 to 66 days. They docked with the station the next day, and gave a televised tour 8 July 1976.

Their stay coincided with the start of the Siber military exercise in Siberia, which they observed as part of an assessment of the station's military surveillance capabilities. They conducted only a few scientific experiments, including the first use of the Kristall furnace for crystal growth. Engineering experiments included propellant transfer system tests with implications for future operation of the freight-carrying Progress spacecraft.

Experiments conducted during the mission were mainly of a military nature as part of the Almaz program. Various purely scientific tasks were also carried out, including solar observations and biological observations of an aquarium of fish carried into orbit. A television link-up with school children on 17 August 1976 was also undertaken.

On 24 August 1976, it was announced the mission was to end in only 10 hours, a development which caught even the reporters of Radio Moscow by surprise. The reason for the sudden termination of the mission was reported at the time to have been an acrid odor that developed in the environmental control system. The problem was said to have begun as early as 17 August 1976. The Soviets made no comments at the time, but the next crew to board the station wore breathing masks. Later reports indicate that the mission may have ended owing to a deterioration in the health of Zholobov. The mission was to last two months but was cut short by a gradually worsening illness of Zholobov.

The cosmonauts boarded Soyuz 21 but as Volynov tried to undock from the station, the docking latches failed to release properly. As he fired the jets to move the spacecraft away, the docking mechanism jammed, resulting in the Soyuz being undocked but still linked to Salyut. As the two spacecraft moved out of range of ground communications, the cosmonauts received only the first set of emergency procedures. Volynov tried a second time to undock but only managed slightly to loosen the latches. The situation persisted for an entire orbit, 90 minutes, when the final set of emergency procedures were received and the crew finally disengaged the latches.

Because Soyuz 21 was returning early, it was outside the normal recovery window. It then encountered strong winds as it descended, which caused uneven firing of the retrorockets. It made a hard landing around midnight  at the southwest of Kokchetav, Kazakhstan.

Zholobov's illness was apparently caused by nitric acid fumes leaking from the Salyut's propellant tanks; other reports, however, indicate that the crew failed to follow their physical exercise program and suffered from lack of sleep. Sources at NASA have reported that psychologists with the Russian Aviation and Space Agency cited Soyuz 21 as ending prematurely due to unspecified "interpersonal issues" with the crew. The next mission to successfully dock with the station, Soyuz 24, would vent Salyut 5's air to space and replace it due to concerns the air had become toxic.

References 

Crewed Soyuz missions
1976 in the Soviet Union
Spacecraft launched in 1976
Spacecraft which reentered in 1976
Spacecraft launched by Soyuz rockets